Voila or Voilà may refer to:

Music
 VOILÀ, LA-based pop-rock duo featuring Gus Ross and Luke Eisner
 Voila (album), by singer Belinda Carlisle
 "Voila", a single by Radio Killer which charted in Romania
 Voila!, an album by Italian singer In-Grid 
 "Voilà" (Barbara Pravi song), 2020 song by French singer Barbara Pravi
 "Voilà", a song by French singer Françoise Hardy
 "Voila", a song by Mogwai from the album Magik Six
 "Voila", a song by Death Grips from the album The Powers That B

Others
 Voilà, also known as Comcel Haiti, a phone company in Haiti
 La belle que voilà, a novel by Louis Hémon
 Voila, Brașov, a commune in Romania
 Voilà, formerly known as AMICUS, is the Union catalog for library materials in Canada.

See also 
 Viola (disambiguation)